Kete is a Turkish  flaky pastry.

Regional styles
Bayburt ketesi
Kars ketesi
Erzurum ketesi
Kelkit ketesi 
Erzincan tandır ketesi
Sivas ketesi
Artvin ketesi
Bitlis ketesi
Kayseri ketesi
Giresun ketesi
Van ketesi
Siirt ketesi

See also
Gata (food) from Armenia
Qatlama

References 

Breads
Turkish cuisine
Appetizers
Turkish breads